Leila Feinstein (born February 4, 1972) is a Thai-American television news anchor based in Los Angeles, most recently working for Tribune-owned KTLA.

Biography 
Feinstein joined KTLA full-time in March 2003 after working at the station on and off as a freelance reporter and anchor for two years. She is the co-anchor of the KTLA prime news and has also worked as the weekend sports anchor and weekday news reporter for KTLA prime news. She has received a Los Angeles Press Club Award and a Golden Mike Award for a report on a local quadriplegic surfer and another Golden Mike for the KTLA News special "Access Asia."

Before joining KTLA, Feinstein worked as a general assignment reporter and fill-in anchor at KRON in San Francisco and BAY-TV in San Francisco and San Jose. She also worked as a sideline reporter for Fox Sports Net and as a general assignment reporter and weekend weather anchor at KCOY in Santa Maria. Feinstein worked as a general assignment reporter and weekend weather anchor at WSEE in Erie, Pennsylvania.

Feinstein began her broadcasting career as an associate producer at CBS while obtaining her Master's degree in broadcast journalism at NYU. She has a Bachelor's degree in political science and theatre/dance from Brown University. Feinstein won a student Emmy Award for a report on the police abuse of homeless people in New York City while in school and has also received a fellowship from the Society of Professional Journalists.

Feinstein takes part in a lot of volunteer work, as she is a member of the Asian American Journalists Association, mentors teenagers, and works with victims of domestic violence. She appears at many KTLA-sponsored and public community events. She also volunteers with deaf children in the community and speaks Thai and French.

Personal 
Feinstein enjoys spending time with her children as well as swimming, dancing, camping, and
yoga.

Leila Feinstein's father Alan Shawn Feinstein is the founder of the Feinstein Foundation, a non-profit organization dedicated to furthering education and ending hunger. Her mother Dr. Pratarnporn Feinstein, a psychiatrist and native of Bangkok, Thailand. Leila Feinstein is of mixed Jewish and Thai descent.

References

External links 
Feinstein Foundation

1972 births
Television anchors from Los Angeles
Television anchors from San Francisco
Living people
American expatriates in Thailand
American people of Jewish descent